George Allan Worthington (10 October 1928 – 8 December 1964) was an Australian male tennis player who was active in the 1940s and 1950s.

Career
Worthington won the mixed doubles title at the Australian Championships in 1951, 1952 and 1953 together with Thelma Coyne Long.

He was twice runner-up with compatriot Frank Sedgman in Grand Slam men's doubles championship. In 1947 they lost the final of the Australian Championship against Adrian Quist and John Bromwich in straight sets and in 1949 in the U.S. National Championship they met the same fate against fellow Australians John Bromwich and Bill Sidwell.

He won a number of career singles titles including the British Pro Championships six times consecutively from 1957 to 1962, the Slazenger Pro Championships two times, (1957, 1962), the Sydney Metropolitan Championships three times, (1950, 1953-54), and the Surrey Championships one time, (1953), the East of England Championships one time, (1949) and the New Zealand Championships one time, (1950). 

After his active playing career he became coach at the All-England Lawn Tennis Club and coached both the English Davis Cup team and Wightman Cup team.

According to Ken Rosewall, he was "an excellent player in practice. He was known as the 'Champion of Practice'".

Grand Slam finals

Doubles (2 runner-ups)

Mixed doubles (3 titles)

References

External links
 
 

Australian male tennis players
Tennis players from Sydney
1928 births
1964 deaths
Grand Slam (tennis) champions in mixed doubles
Professional tennis players before the Open Era
Australian tennis coaches
Grand Slam (tennis) champions in boys' doubles
Australian Championships (tennis) junior champions
Australian Championships (tennis) champions